Granrodeo (stylized as GRANRODEO) is a Japanese rock band, specializing in creating anime soundtracks.

Career
In 2005 voice actor Kishō Taniyama ("Kishow") and musician Masaaki Iizuka ("E-Zuka"), known for his collaborations in creating anime soundtracks, decided to create a new project. During their years as a band, they released a few singles that were used as opening singles for the anime series.

In 2007 they released their first album, Ride on the Edge, and in 2008 they release a second album, Instinct. In spring 2009 they started working on the soundtrack, the series Needless, for which E-Zuka wrote the soundtracks and Kishow wrote the lyrics for the song "Modern Strange Cowboy". By the end of 2009, they released their third album, Brush the Scar Lemon. In 2011 they released their fourth album, Supernova, and in 2012 they released their fifth album Crack Star Flash.

Granrodeo covered "Tell Me" for the June 6, 2018 hide tribute album Tribute Impulse.

They provided a cover of "Tenshi wa Dare da" for the January 29, 2020 Buck-Tick tribute album Parade III ~Respective Tracks of Buck-Tick~

Members
 Kishow - vocals, lyrics. According to him, the role of a vocalist is more suitable for him than the role of a voice actor.
 E-Zuka - Guitar, composer, arranging. His style of playing the guitar combines melodic solo parts and aggressive guitar riffs. He also collaborates with Minami Kuribayashi.

Session musicians
 Ikuo – bass guitar (bassist of the band Bull Zeichen 88). Previously played in the progressive rock band Lapis Lazuli, known for its soundtrack albums for the game Guilty Gear. He also plays the bass for the band Abingdon Boys School & Minami Kuribayashi.

Discography

Albums

Studio albums

Mini albums

Best albums

Soundtrack albums

Compilation albums

Singles

Collaboration Singles

References

External links
  
 Lantis official artist page 
 e-Zuka on the ESP site
 

Anime musical groups
Japanese hard rock musical groups
Lantis (company) artists
Musical groups established in 2005
Musical groups from Tokyo